Heinz Ulzheimer (December 27, 1925 – December 18, 2016) was a West German track and field athlete, who mainly competed in the 800 metres. He was born in Höchst. He competed in the 800 metres for Germany at the 1952 Summer Olympics held in Helsinki, Finland, where he won the bronze medal.  He then assisted the German team in the 4 x 400 metre relay where he won the bronze medal with his team mates Hans Geister, Günther Steines and Karl-Friedrich Haas. He died at the age of 90 in 2016.

References

1925 births
2016 deaths
German male middle-distance runners
German male sprinters
Olympic bronze medalists for West Germany
Athletes (track and field) at the 1952 Summer Olympics
Olympic athletes of West Germany
European Athletics Championships medalists
Medalists at the 1952 Summer Olympics
Olympic bronze medalists in athletics (track and field)
Eintracht Frankfurt athletes